Mohammad Khazaee (born 12 April 1953 in Kashmar, Iran) is the former Ambassador of Iran to the United Nations. He presented his credentials to the United Nations Secretary-General Ban Ki-moon in July 2007. He was elected as Vice President of the United Nations General Assembly on 14 September 2011.

Career

Education
Khazaee has a B.A. in Business Administration from the University of Guilan. He also holds a master's degree in international transactions from George Mason University in the United States, Mr. Khazaee has taught macroeconomics and philosophy at Tehran’s Allameh Tabatabai University.

Parliament
From 1981 to 1988, Khazaee was a Member of Parliament, where he served as Rapporteur of the Economic Committee (1982–1988) and the Banking Reform Committee (1981–1982).

Government appointments
Prior to receiving his appointment as Permanent Representative, Khazaee held positions in international development financing between 2002 and 2007, serving as both Vice-Minister for International Affairs and President of the Organization for Economic and Technical Assistance in Iran's Ministry of Economic Affairs. Concurrently, he served as Governor of the OPEC Fund, Vice-Chairman of that organization's Investment Committee, Alternate Governor for the Islamic Development Bank and a board member of the Iran-Misr (Iran-Egypt) Development Bank.  From 1988 to 2002, he represented Iran at the World Bank.

References

External links

The Permanent Mission of the IR Iran to the UN
A conversation with Mohammad Khazaee, Part1, Charlie Rose Show, December 7, 2007.

1953 births
Permanent Representatives of Iran to the United Nations
Living people
George Mason University alumni
Members of the 2nd Islamic Consultative Assembly
Members of the 1st Islamic Consultative Assembly
People from Kashmar